Re Peveril Gold Mines Ltd [1898] 1 Ch 122 is a UK insolvency law case concerning liquidation when a company is unable to repay its debts. It held that a member cannot be prevented by a company constitution from bringing a winding up petition. It is, however, possible for a member to make a shareholder agreement and thus contract out of the right to bring a winding up petition outside of the company.

Facts
The articles of association of Peveril Gold Mines Ltd said no member should petition for winding up unless two directors had consented or the general meeting had resolved or a petitioner held at least 20% of issued capital. A member asked for winding up without satisfying any of these conditions.

Judgment
Lord Lindley MR held that the member was entitled to do so. He said ‘these registered limited companies are incorporated on certain conditions; they continue to exist on certain conditions; and they are liable to be dissolved on certain conditions.’ He pointed to the predecessors of Insolvency Act 1986 sections 122 and sections 124 and said they set out circumstance when a company can be dissolved by the court and who can petition. A member could not be restricted.

Chitty LJ and Vaughan Williams LJ concurred.

See also

UK insolvency law

Notes

References
L Sealy and S Worthington, Cases and Materials in Company Law (9th edn OUP 2010)
R Goode, Principles of Corporate Insolvency Law (4th edn Sweet & Maxwell 2011)

United Kingdom insolvency case law
Court of Appeal (England and Wales) cases
1898 in case law
1898 in British law